Sir Charles Geoffrey Prior KCIE FRGS (9 December 1896 – 11 October 1972) was a British Indian Army and Indian Political Service officer. 

The only son of Richard Delabere Prior, the young Prior was educated at Shrewsbury School and then trained at the Royal Military College, Sandhurst, from where he was commissioned into the Indian Army on 14 July 1915. In August 1923, he joined the political service department, in which he rose to be under-secretary. He was appointed a Commander of the Order of the Indian Empire in 1936 and in 1943 was made a knight commander of the same Order. By the time of the British withdrawal from India in August 1947, Prior held the rank of Lieutenant Colonel.

Prior was one of the last Chief Commissioners of Baluchistan, during the era of British India.

References

Graduates of the Royal Military College, Sandhurst
1896 births
1972 deaths
Knights Commander of the Order of the Indian Empire
Indian Political Service officers
People educated at Shrewsbury School
British Indian Army officers
British expatriates in South Africa
Fellows of the Royal Geographical Society